Uhelná (until 1948 Serksdorf) is a municipality and village in Jeseník District in the Olomouc Region of the Czech Republic. It has about 500 inhabitants.

Administrative parts
Villages and hamlets of Červený Důl, Dolní Fořt, Horní Fořt, Hraničky and Nové Vilémovice are administrative parts of Uhelná.

Notable people
Robert Latzel (1845–1919), Austrian myriapodologist and entomologist

References

Villages in Jeseník District
Czech Silesia